The ISTTOK Tokamak ("Instituto Superior Técnico TOKamak") is a research fusion reactor (tokamak) of the Instituto Superior Técnico. It has a circular cross-section due to a poloidal graphite limiter and an iron core transformer. Its particularity is that it is one of the few tokamaks operating in AC (alternating plasma current) regime, as well in DC regime. In 2013, the AC operation allowed the standard discharges to extend from 35 ms to more than 1s.

Characteristics 
 Minor radius: 0.085 metre
 Major radius: 0.46 metre
 Plasma current: ~7kA kiloAmperes
 Plasma life span: 30/1000 milliseconds (DC/AC)
 Maximum toroidal magnetic field: 2.8 Tesla
 Nominal toroidal magnetic field: 0.3-0.6 Tesla

See also 
 Small Tight Aspect Ratio Tokamak
 Ball-pen probe

External links 
 ISTTOK  official site

Tokamaks
Nuclear research institutes
University of Lisbon